Explora can refer to:

 Ici Explora, Canadian French-language television channel
 Explora (Albuquerque, New Mexico), science center in Albuquerque, New Mexico, USA
 Parque Explora, science museum in Medellín, Colombia
 Explora-Museum, science museum in Frankfurt am Main, Germany 
 Explora Phones Inc, New York-based telecommunications company
 Explora Petroleum, Norwegian oil company 
 Explora Knoll, undersea knoll in the Antarctic
 Explora (magazine), Italian monthly magazine 
 Explora (comics), series of comics published by Glénat since 2012 
 Explora (Light studio), Indian light studio